Sebastian Hille (born 19 October 1980) is a German football coach and former player. In 2015, he became assistant manager of the Arminia Bielefeld U19.

Career
Hille was born in Soest. He made two appearances for VfL Bochum in the Bundesliga before joining Borussia Dortmund II.

References

External links
 

1980 births
Living people
People from Soest, Germany
Sportspeople from Arnsberg (region)
German footballers
Association football forwards
Hammer SpVg players
Arminia Bielefeld players
FC Gütersloh 2000 players
VfL Bochum players
VfL Bochum II players
Borussia Dortmund II players
Rot Weiss Ahlen players
Bundesliga players
2. Bundesliga players
3. Liga players
Footballers from North Rhine-Westphalia